Folker is Paul Westerberg's sixth solo album. It peaked at number 178 on the Billboard 200 and number 18 on the Top Independent Album charts.

Folker marks the final chapter in a trilogy of albums for the previous leader of The Replacements, which started back in 2002 with the release of the double album Stereo/Mono. Much like that set, Folker was entirely written, produced and recorded by Westerberg in his basement studio, with the recording kept as simple and lo-fi as possible. Westerberg has stated in interviews that he wanted to create a folk album in the vein of Rod Stewart's earliest solo work, consisting of an acoustic bass with minimal instrumentation layered on top of the tracks.

Westerberg shopped "Jingle" around to major retailers like Target and Best Buy for use in advertising, but they passed.

All versions of Folker contain the Sandy Denny song "Who Knows Where The Time Goes," which follows "Folk Star" in track 13. The song is credited in the liner notes. The European release of Folker has a second hidden song on track 13, "Be Bad For Me," which plays after approximately three minutes of silence. There is a hype sticker on the case which announces this bonus track.

Track listing
All songs by Paul Westerberg.

"Jingle" – 1:28
"Now I Wonder" – 4:35
"My Dad" – 3:28
"Lookin' Up in Heaven" – 3:12
"Anyway's All Right" – 4:41
"$100 Groom" – 5:15
"23 Years Ago" – 5:35
"As Far as I Know" – 3:03
"What About Mine?" – 3:43
"How Can You Like Him?" – 4:04
"Breathe Some New Life" – 5:30
"Gun Shy" – 3:14
"Folk Star" – 4:17

References

2004 albums
Paul Westerberg albums
Vagrant Records albums
Albums produced by Paul Westerberg